Air Vice-Marshal Clare Samantha Walton,  is a senior Royal Air Force officer and physician. Since 24 February 2020, she has been Director Defence Medical Personnel & Training, based at Defence Medical Services Whittington. In October 2022, it was announced that Walton had been appointed as Director General of the Defence Medical Services, with the rank of Air Marshal, to take effect from July 2023.

RAF career
Walton was commissioned into the Medical Branch of the Royal Air Force (RAF) on 27 March 1987 as a pilot officer: she was being sponsored through her degree by a University Cadetship with the RAF. She graduated from St Bartholomew's Hospital Medical School with Bachelor of Medicine, Bachelor of Surgery (MB, BS) degrees in 1989. After training at Royal Air Force College Cranwell, she was promoted to squadron leader on 1 August 1990. She transferred from a short service commission to a permanent commission on 24 April 1992. She has served a number of posting abroad, including with the United Nations Protection Force in Bosnia-Herzegovina, in Kuwait as part of Operation Desert Fox, and in Iraq as part of Operation Telic.

From 2011 to 2014, Walton served as commanding officer of Defence Medical Rehabilitation Centre Headley Court. She was appointed Air Officer Medical Operations in No. 38 Group RAF on 13 June 2016. She was then Commander of the Defence Medical Group from 2018 to 2020.

She was appointed Companion of the Order of the Bath (CB) in the 2022 New Year Honours.

References

Living people
Year of birth missing (living people)
Royal Air Force air marshals
Companions of the Order of the Bath
Female air marshals of the Royal Air Force
Royal Air Force Medical Service officers
20th-century Royal Air Force personnel
21st-century Royal Air Force personnel